An election to Cork City Council took place on 5 June 2009 as part of that year's Irish local elections. 31 councillors were elected from six electoral divisions by PR-STV voting for a five-year term of office.

Results by party

Results by Electoral Area

Cork North-Central

Cork North-East

Cork North-West

Cork South-Central

Cork South-East

Cork South-West

External links
 http://www.corkcity.ie/

2009 Irish local elections
2009